Cosmetovigilance is the ongoing and systematic monitoring of the safety of cosmetics in terms of human health. The aim is to detect adverse effects of cosmetic products, and to prevent adverse effects by taking appropriate measures. Regulations for cosmetic products primarily address the safety of products that may be used by large populations of healthy consumers. The identification and analysis of adverse effects related to cosmetic products is a process that is currently still, to a large extent, industry driven. It is the responsibility of manufacturers to determine that products and ingredients are safe before they are marketed, and then to collect reports of adverse reactions.

The legal basis for monitoring cosmetics in the U.S.A. is The Federal Food, Drug, and Cosmetic Act (FD&C Act), which defines cosmetics by their intended use, as “articles intended to be rubbed, poured, sprinkled, or sprayed on, introduced into, or otherwise applied to the human body...for cleansing, beautifying, promoting attractiveness, or altering the appearance”. Among the products included in this definition are skin moisturizers, perfumes, lipsticks, fingernail polishes, eye and facial makeup preparations, shampoos, permanent waves, hair colors, toothpastes, and deodorants, as well as any material intended for use as a component of a cosmetic product.

In the US, state regulation applies in addition to federal regulation. For example, California's governor Arnold Schwarzenegger signed off fiercely contested toxics legislation that requires cosmetic producers to report use of ingredients classified as carcinogenic or toxic to reproduction, a measure primarily aimed at phthalates.
 
The legal basis for monitoring cosmetics in the European Union is derived from Cosmetics Directive 76/768/EEC.  This 1976 directive requires that cosmetic products 'must not cause damage to human health when applied under normal or reasonably foreseeable conditions of use'. The safety officer of a company with marketed cosmetics files product information, including a safety report, in electronic or other format to the competent authority of the Member State. This takes place after placing cosmetic products on the market, with updates by state requirement.

The practical consequence of cosmetics legislation is a requirement for continuous observation of cosmetic products after marketing. This applies particularly to "adverse effects" and "serious adverse effects". The European legislation defines "adverse effect" as a negative impact on human health, which is attributable to the normal or reasonably foreseeable use of a cosmetic product. A "serious adverse effect" resulting in temporary or permanent functional incapacity, disability, hospitalization, congenital anomalies or an immediate danger to life or death.

See also
Pharmacovigilance
Nutricosmetics
Cosmeceutical

References

Cosmetics